Ian Maxwell (born 1956) is a British businessman and co-founder of the think tank Combating Jihadist Terrorism. In the 1990s, Maxwell was  acquitted of charges of criminal financial malpractice relating to the business practices of his father, publishing tycoon Robert Maxwell.

Early life and education
Maxwell, born 1956 in Maisons-Laffitte, France, is the son of Elisabeth (née Meynard), a French-born scholar, and Robert Maxwell, a Czechoslovak-born media mogul. His father was Jewish and his mother was a French Protestant of Huguenot descent. He is one of nine siblings, of which two died in childhood. These include sisters Isabel, Christine, Anne and Ghislaine, and brother Kevin. The family moved to Headington Hill Hall in 1960.

Ian Maxwell was educated at Summer Fields School, Marlborough College and Oxford University.

Career
Maxwell's first involvement in his father's business was at Pergamon Press from 1978 to 1983. After a short time at the Prince's Charitable Trust, he rejoined the Maxwell business, this time at British Printing and Communications Corporation (later renamed Maxwell Communications Corporation). In 1991, it was reported that Maxwell worked for The European.

Ian Maxwell was appointed chairman of Mirror Group Newspapers plc (MGN) following the death of his father on 5 November 1991. For the next month, the group was the subject of speculation regarding its financial position. On 3 December 1991, Maxwell and his brother Kevin resigned from the board of Maxwell Communication Corporation and nine hours later resigned from MGN, following the disclosure that "many million" of pounds had been transferred from the Mirror Group pension fund to Robert Maxwell's private companies apparently without due authority. MGN announced: "Because of increasing conflicts of interest, Ian Maxwell, chairman and publisher of MGN, Kevin Maxwell, and Michael Stoney, who has a major management involvement in the Maxwell private companies, have today resigned from the board of MGN and its subsidiaries and have also ceased their executive duties in the MGN Group."

On 19 June 1992, Ian Maxwell, Kevin Maxwell, and their financial advisor Larry Trachtenberg were arrested and charged with conspiracy to defraud others of millions of dollars. In January 1996, all three were acquitted.

In 1995, Maxwell was involved with Maximov Publications, a company with a focus on content about Russia and the Soviet Union's former republics.

The Scotsman reported in 2001 that Maxwell was a director of 31 companies and also worked for Westbourne Communications, a public relations firm which represented Telemonde.

Maxwell announced in September 2018 that he and his brother Kevin had founded a UK think tank, Combating Jihadist Terrorism (CoJit), with the aim of better understanding terrorism and its causes. As of 2020, Maxwell was CoJit's director.

Personal life 
In 1991, Maxwell married Laura Marie Plumb, an American former fashion model from Chicago, currently a practitioner Indian astrology, ayurveda and yoga. They announced their separation in 1996, and the pair later divorced. Maxwell remarried in 1999 to Tara Dudley Smith.

In March 2021, Maxwell expressed concern about the welfare in a US prison of his sister Ghislaine who was then awaiting trial on criminal charges relating to her association with Jeffrey Epstein.

References

External links 
 Q&A: What does the Maxwell report mean? BBC News. 30 March 2001
 On This Day: 1991: Maxwell business empire faces bankruptcy BBC News 5 December 1991
 Kevin Maxwell given 45 days to find £1m The Times 18 June 2004
 DTI will not take action against Maxwell chiefs The Scotsman 16 March 2002

1956 births
Living people
British businesspeople
People educated at Marlborough College
British people of French descent
British people of Czech-Jewish descent
British people of Ukrainian-Jewish descent
Maxwell family